Deer Medicine Rocks (Siouan: literal translation "Antler Rocks") is a sandstone formation located on the west bank of Rosebud Creek in the vicinity of Lame Deer, Montana, United States.  The formation is significant for its association with the Great Sioux War of 1876-77, and its connection with Sitting Bull's visionary sun dance of early June 1876 which prophesied victory at the Battle of the Little Bighorn.  At its nomination to National Historic Landmark status in 2011, it was described as the only site to offer "a wholly Native American historical interpretation of the Battle of the Little Big Horn."

This is located on private property and you need a tribal member to take you there.

Description
The Deer Medicine Rocks are located on the west bank of Rosebud Creek. They are formed out of a sandstone promontory originally part of the hills that rise west of the creek, with erosive forces removing the intervening material. The surfaces at its base have numerous rock art panels. Expert opinion is divided on the ages of much of this artwork, with age ranges proposed from 1000 to 4000 years ago. Some of the artwork is clearly post-contact origin, depicting cowboys, horses, and guns. The panels depict themes and images common to other rock art sites found throughout the region.

One particular panel shows soldiers with long grasshopper legs falling into a camp.  This is interpreted by the Lakota and Cheyenne as showing the vision of Sitting Bull in which he predicted the victory at Little Big Horn during a sun dance held here.  The sun dance took place during a major encampment that probably involved more than 3,000 Native Americans from several tribal groups.  The Deer Medicine Rocks are the first National Historic Landmark designated for its association with the Great Sioux War that is not a battlefield, and the first to provide a distinctly native view of the campaign.

See also

 Medicine Rock State Historic Site
 Medicine Rocks State Park
 List of National Historic Landmarks in Montana
 National Register of Historic Places listings in Rosebud County, Montana

Notes

National Historic Landmarks in Montana
Native American history of Montana
Archaeological sites on the National Register of Historic Places in Montana
Landforms of Rosebud County, Montana
Petroglyphs in Montana
National Register of Historic Places in Rosebud County, Montana
Great Sioux War of 1876
Sandstone formations of the United States